Rajeshwari Rameshwar Goyal (born 15 December 1981 in Orai, Uttar Pradesh) is a One Day International cricketer who represents India. She is a right hand batsman and bowls right-arm off-breaks. She has played five ODIs, taking three wickets.

References

Living people
1981 births
People from Jalaun district
India women One Day International cricketers

Mumbai women cricketers
Gujarat women cricketers
West Zone women cricketers